Bangladesh Stock Exchange may refer to:

Dhaka Stock Exchange (founded 1954)
Chittagong Stock Exchange (founded 1995)